The Sudanese Socialist Union (abbr. SSU;  Al-Ittihad Al-Ishtiraki Al-Sudaniy) was a political party in Sudan. The SSU was the country's sole legal party from 1971 until 1985, when the regime of President Gaafar Nimeiry was overthrown in a military coup.

Today the Sudanese Socialist Democratic Union, the successor party to the SSU, exists as a registered political party in Sudan. Until 2018, it was led by Professor Dr. Fatima Abdel Mahmoud, who was Sudan's first female Minister during the Presidency of Gaafar Nimeiry as well as a former member of the National Congress Party. Professor Dr. Fatima Abdel Mahmoud was the first woman to contest the Presidency of Sudan in the 2010 general election.

Electoral history

Presidential elections

National Assembly elections

See also 
1969 Sudanese coup d'état
List of political parties in Sudan

References

1971 establishments in Sudan
Anti-communist parties
Arab nationalism in Sudan
Arab socialist political parties
Defunct nationalist parties
Defunct political parties in Sudan
Defunct socialist parties
Nasserist political parties
Nationalist parties in Africa
Parties of one-party systems
Political parties disestablished in 1985
Political parties established in 1971
Socialist parties in Sudan